Gautami is a Microsoft Windows typeface used to display the Telugu script. Versions of it have been supplied in Windows Server 2003, Windows Server 2008, Windows XP, Windows Vista, Windows 7 and Windows 8.
It contains Unicode support for the following ranges:

Basic Latin
 Latin-1 Supplement
 Telugu

The name "Gautami" was given by Radhika Mamidi, a resource person for Telugu, from the National Centre for Software Technology, working with R K Joshi's team. It refers to the tributary Gautami of Godavari River.

References

Microsoft typefaces
Brahmic typefaces
Sans-serif typefaces
Typefaces and fonts introduced in 2011